Born in East L.A. may refer to:

 "Born in East L.A." (song), a song by Cheech & Chong
 Born in East L.A. (film), a film starred and directed by Cheech Marin